Assata aka Joanne Chesimard is a 2008 biographical film directed by Fred Baker and starring Warly Ceriani. The film premiered at the San Diego Black Film Festival and starred Assata Shakur.

Premise
The film is a biography of Assata Shakur, a controversial member of the Black Panther movement.

Cast
Will Blagrove: FBI Agent
Rick Borgia: District Attorney
J.D. Brown: Trooper Werner Foerster
Kathleen Cleaver: Herself
Pat Dempsey: James Harper (as Jack P. Dempsey)
Lila Dupree: White Woman - Escape
Charles Everett: Justin
 Omar Gonzalez: Fred Hampton Jr.
 Steven Hill: Sundiata Acoli
Rosemari Mealy: Herself
Bryant Pearson: Lead Escaper
Robert Sciglimpaglia: Assistant Prosecuting Attorney
Assata Shakur: Herself
Char Sydney: Assata - as young woman
Erika Vaughn: Asha

References

External links

2008 films
American biographical films
2000s English-language films
2000s American films